Qoʻyliq is a Tashkent Metro station and the southern terminus of Circle Line. It was opened on 30 August 2020 as part of the inaugural section of the line between Doʻstlik 2 and Qoʻylik. The adjacent station is Yangiobod.

References

Tashkent Metro stations
2020 establishments in Uzbekistan
Railway stations opened in 2020